LORAN-C transmitter Searchlight  was the Yankee secondary of the U.S. West Coast LORAN-C Chain (GRI 9940) and the Whiskey secondary of the South Central U.S. Chain (GRI 9610). The station, established in 1976, consisted of four  transmission towers. There were five active duty and 2 reserve duty Coast Guard personnel stationed at LORSTA Searchlight. The station's Officer in Charge was a Chief Electronics Technician.

The station was closed on February 8, 2010, as a budget cut.  The station, and all of the others, were considered to be obsolete with the general availability of GPS systems.

The four masts were demolished.

Notes 

Formerly Used Defense Sites in Nevada
Searchlight
Closed facilities of the United States Coast Guard
Towers in Nevada
United States Coast Guard Aviation
1976 establishments in Nevada
2010 disestablishments in Nevada